Daniel E. Wonderly (April 21, 1922 – December 3, 2004) was an American biologist and old-earth creationist who taught at Grace College, where he helped to establish the biology department.

Biography
Wonderly was born on April 21, 1922 in Mountain Lake Park, Maryland, to Earl and Gustava Wonderly. After graduating from Oakland High School in Oakland, Maryland in 1940, he attended the Southeastern Bible College for two years. He was then drafted into the United States Army, in which capacity he served in both Japan and Europe during World War II. After the war, he returned to the United States to attend Wheaton College, where he earned a Bachelor of Arts degree in anthropology in 1949. He then enrolled at Central Baptist Seminary in Kansas City, Kansas, from which he received a Bachelor of Divinity degree and a Master of Theology degree in 1952 and 1955, respectively. In 1961, he earned a Master of Science degree in zoology from Ohio University; he began teaching at Wingate College the same year. He joined the faculty of Grace College in 1966 and continued to teach there until 1973. From 1974 to 1977, he wrote the book God's Time-Records in Ancient Sediments with the aim of educating his fellow Christians about the geology of sedimentary rocks. He followed this with a second book, Neglect of Geologic Data: Sedimentary Strata Compared with Young-Earth Creationist Writings, which was published in 1987. He died on December 3, 2004 at Garrett County Memorial Hospital in Oakland.

Views on creationism
Despite being a theologically conservative Baptist, Wonderly accepted the scientific evidence that the Earth was much older than young-earth creationists believe it to be. In explaining his views on evolution and the age of the Earth, he wrote, "Christians need to reject evolutionism, but when they reject true scientific discoveries they bring disgrace upon the Bible and Christianity." He supported reconciling the old age of the Earth with the teachings of the Bible by means of day-age creationism. When administrators at Grace College learned about Wonderly's unfavorable views of young-earth creationism and flood geology, they agreed to hire him only on the condition that he not interfere with the College's commitment to advancing young-earth creationism. Wonderly agreed, but after some of his students found out about his views, the College's president banned Wonderly from further discussing his views at all, prompting Wonderly to resign. Prominent young-earth creationist Henry Morris defended Grace's handling of Wonderly's anti-creationist views, arguing that these views were already receiving a fair hearing throughout society.

References

1922 births
2004 deaths
People from Garrett County, Maryland
American Christian creationists
United States Army personnel of World War II
Baptists from Maryland
Grace College faculty
Wheaton College (Illinois) alumni
Ohio University alumni
Wingate University faculty
20th-century American biologists
Christian Old Earth creationists
20th-century Baptists